Dune London is a British shoe manufacturer and retailer. Its product line include shoes for women, men, and children as well as fashion accessories.

Dune was founded by Daniel Rubin in 1992. His grandfather was a shoemaker who migrated to the UK from Lithuania in 1895. Together with his three sons, they started a workshop in London's Whitechapel. It was established as a small concession store situated at London's Oxford Street.

As of 2022, Dune has "over 350 store locations worldwide". The company claims that a pair of shoes undergoes more than 120 processes.

References

Manufacturing companies of the United Kingdom
Privately held companies of the United Kingdom
Shoe brands
Shoe companies of the United Kingdom
British companies established in 1992